Orit Bar-On (אורית בראון; born November 17, 1975) is an Israeli judoka.

Bar-On was born in Netanya, Israel.

Judo career
She was trained in judo by Israeli Olympic silver medalist Yael Arad. Bar-On won the national Israeli judo championships in 1990-2002, in weight classes ranging from U56 to U63. 

In 1997 Bar-On won the gold medal at the Swedish Open Göteborg (U56). In 1998, she won the Moscow International Tournament (U57), and finished in seventh place at both the Judo European and World Championships.  

In 1999 she finished in seventh place at the World Championship. In 2001, Bar-On won the gold medal at the German Open.

Bar-On competed for Israel at the 2000 Summer Olympics in Sydney, Australia, in Women's Lightweight Judo (57-kg division).

References

External links
 
 
 

1975 births
Living people
People from Netanya
Israeli female judoka
Olympic judoka of Israel
Judoka at the 2000 Summer Olympics